Jullan Kindahl (12 April 1885 – 18 April 1979) was a Swedish actress. Born Julia Carolina Carlsson, she worked as an actress from 1900s until the 1960s. She appeared in Swedish theatres like the Hippodromen in Malmö, the Malmö City Theatre in Malmö and the Stora Teatern in Göteborg. Kindahl also made 33 films between 1923 and 1962. She remains perhaps best known for her domestic supporting roles in two films: as the cook Beata in Smiles of a Summer Night (1955) and as Professor Borg's housekeeper Agda in Wild Strawberries (1957), both of which were directed by Ingmar Bergman. She was married to actor Arvid Kindahl (1887–1927) from 1913 until his early death.

Partial filmography

 Janne Modig (1923) – Olivia Blåqvist
 Miljonär för en dag (1926) – Maid
 Vad kvinnan vill (1927) – Amanda
 På kryss med Blixten (1927) – Månsson
 Hattmakarens bal (1928) – Retainer
 Jansson's Temptation (1928) – Kerstin
 Inled mig i frestelse (1933) – Lundén
 Andersson's Kalle (1934) – Mrs. Lundström
 Svensson ordnar allt! (1938) – Hostess
 It Is My Music (1942) – Mrs. Johansson
 Stinsen på Lyckås (1942) – Mrs. Nilsson
 En vår i vapen (1943) – Mormor
 Elvira Madigan (1943) – Trine, Elvira's Mother
 The Sin of Anna Lans (1943) – Gossiping Lady
 Det går som en dans... (1943) – Landlady
 I dag gifter sig min man (1943) – Maria
 Gentleman with a Briefcase (1943) – Boarding house hostess (uncredited)
 Aktören (1943) – Mrs. Pettersson
 Blizzard (1944) – Maria
 The Old Clock at Ronneberga (1944) – Madame Hallström
 I Am Fire and Air (1944) – Mrs. Frida Sundelin
 Blåjackor (1945) – Miss Ripa
 The Journey Away (1945) – Nurse (uncredited)
 Den glade skräddaren (1945) – Mrs. Larsson, midwife (uncredited)
 I Love You Karlsson (1947) – Hulda
 Smiles of a Summer Night (1955) – Beata, cook
 The Light from Lund (1955) – Steen's Mother
 Last Pair Out (1956) – Alma
 Mr. Sleeman Is Coming (1957, TV Movie) – Tant Mina
 Wild Strawberries (1957) – Agda
 The Wedding Day'' (1960) – Asta

References

External links
 

1885 births
1979 deaths
Swedish film actresses
Swedish silent film actresses
Actresses from Stockholm
20th-century Swedish actresses